First Baptist Dallas is a Baptist megachurch located in Dallas, Texas. It is affiliated with the Southern Baptist Convention. It was established in 1868 and, as of 2018, has a congregation of about 13,000. In 2017, weekly attendance for worship services was reported around 3,700 and online attendance was over 10,000 The church, considered influential among evangelical Christians in the United States, also owns and operates a school, several radio stations, and Dallas Life, a mission for the homeless on the southern edge of Downtown Dallas. The current pastor is Dr. Robert Jeffress.

History

The First Baptist Church of Dallas was established on July 30, 1868, with eleven founding members. They convened in the Masonic Hall, located on Lamar Street near Ross Avenue. In 1872, the congregation pooled their funds together to purchase the first building, on Akard, in downtown Dallas. The cornerstone of the sanctuary that the congregation worships in today was laid in 1891.

Since the 1970s, the church has established a number of ministries that are affiliated with the church. First Baptist Academy of Dallas and Criswell College (formerly Criswell Bible Institute) were formed to champion Christian education. In the mid-1970s, Criswell College purchased KCBI to be used as a Christian radio station. The station has resided on the lower frequencies of FM. Now at 90.9 FM, KCBI broadcasts as part of the Criswell Radio Network, and includes KCCE and KSAO of San Angelo, Texas, and KCBK of Frederick, Oklahoma.

In 2013, Ted Cruz, invited by Robert Jeffress, attended the church and gave a speech on faith and the U.S. Constitution to the congregation. Jeffress praised Cruz as "a strong leader and a committed Christian".

In 2013, a 3,000 seat Worship Center and expansion was built at the cost of $130 million, close to the historic building. The center has  of space, and the older facilities were also renovated.

Senior pastors

W. W. Harris was the first pastor and was followed by several others during the early years of the church. In 1897, the first of the two most notable pastors, George Truett, accepted the position of Pastor and remained there until his death in July 1944. In 1944, Dr. W. A. Criswell became the pastor of the church. During his tenure, the church expanded to multiple buildings covering five blocks in Downtown Dallas, eventually becoming the largest Southern Baptist church in the world. Dr. Criswell became Senior Pastor in 1990 and Pastor Emeritus from 1995 until his death in 2002. Since 1990, four pastors have held the pulpit: Joel Gregory, O. S. Hawkins, Mac Brunson, and, currently, Robert Jeffress.

Membership
American evangelist Rev. Billy Graham became a member of the First Baptist Church of Dallas in 1953 while visiting Dallas during his crusade to the area and remained a church member for over fifty years, despite not residing within the Dallas area and only very infrequently visiting the Dallas church. In 2008, the 90-year-old Graham switched his church membership to First Baptist Church of Spartanburg, South Carolina, that was closer to his residence in North Carolina.

Facilities 
In 2013, First Baptist Dallas completed a major renovation and expansion of their facilities, including construction of a new worship center. With a price tag of $130,000,000 it is the most expensive Protestant building project in modern history. In 2019 they announced another $35,000,000 expansion to the Horner Family Center and the addition of a new parking garage, growing the Family Center to 179,000 square feet from an original 98,500 preexisting square footage.

FBC Dallas has a 3,000 seat worship center as well as a large skywalk. It also contains computer-synchronized water fountain playing music. Despite implosion of a large portion of their six-block campus, First Baptist retains the original worship center (in addition to its new worship center) as an ancillary venue for worship services, weddings and other events.

Controversies

W. A. Criswell, in a discussion of racial integration, stated that he expressed astonishment at the cowardice of ministers "whose forebears [sic] and predecessors were martyrs and were burned at the stake", but who themselves refuse to speak up about "this thing of integration". True ministers, he argued, must passionately resist government mandated desegregation because it is "a denial of all that we believe in".

In September 1992, senior pastor Joel C. Gregory announced his resignation. Later, he published a book detaling his reasons for leaving: among them, the refusal of W.A Criswell to relinquish control of the church, despite Gregory being the senior pastor de jure.

Current pastor Jeffress has spoken out in the past against Muslims, Jews, Catholics, Mormons and homosexuals, claiming that Islam "promoted pedophilia". In 2008, Jeffress, in his sermon "Gay Is Not OK", stated that "What they [homosexuals] do is filthy. It [fellatio] is so degrading that it is beyond description. And it is their filthy behavior that explains why they are so much more prone to disease." In September 2010, Pastor Jeffress branded Islam as an "evil, evil religion". And in December 2010, Jeffress established a "Naughty and Nice List" where businesses are identified based on whether or not they openly celebrated Christmas, saying "I wanted to do something positive to encourage businesses to acknowledge Christmas and not bow to the strident voices of a minority who object to the holiday." Also in 2010, he referred to Roman Catholicism as a "Satanic" result of "Babylonian mystery religion". In October 2011 at the Values Voter Summit, Jeffress branded the Church of Jesus Christ of Latter-day Saints (LDS Church) as "a cult". He received widespread criticism for his statement, but he has not retracted it despite then U.S. presidential candidate and LDS church member Mitt Romney's request for him to do so.

See also
Recorded Texas Historic Landmarks in Dallas County

References

George Jackson, Sixty Years in Texas, 1908, pp. 247–248
H. Leon McBeth, The First Baptist Church of Dallas: Centennial History (Grand Rapids, Michigan: Zondervan, 1968)

External links

Criswell College
First Baptist Academy
KCBI, Dallas/Ft. Worth
KCBK, Frederick/Lawton, OK
Dallas Life

Churches in Dallas
Evangelical megachurches in the United States
Megachurches in Texas
Baptist churches in Texas
Southern Baptist Convention churches
Religious organizations established in 1872
1872 establishments in Texas